"Not Ready to Die" is a song by the American heavy metal band Avenged Sevenfold. It was created specifically for the video game Call of Duty: Black Ops (2010), appearing as an easter egg in the game's "Call of the Dead" Zombies map.

Background
Recorded by the band in April 2011, the song was released on 2 May 2011. The song is available to purchase as a digital download from iTunes. "Not Ready to Die" marks the first release recorded with drummer Arin Ilejay. In an interview with Revolver, M. Shadows says the song was completely inspired by the game, which he is a big fan of.

In the song, which is also featured on the game's Zombies expansion map "Call of the Dead", the band's lyrics are of defiance, power and survival, themes that run throughout the widely popular first-person shooter game.  In fact, one of the lines in the song is specifically referencing the game. The song "Damned" ("Zombies" mode theme music in Call of Duty Black Ops, composed by Kevin Sherwood) is also sampled in the song.

Chart position

Track listing
 "Not Ready to Die" – 7:05

Personnel
Avenged Sevenfold
 M. Shadows — lead vocals
 Zacky Vengeance — rhythm guitar, gang vocals
 Synyster Gates — lead guitar, backing and gang vocals
 Johnny Christ — bass guitar, gang vocals
 Arin Ilejay — drums

References

2011 singles
Avenged Sevenfold songs